Guidelines on the choice of agents and how best to step up treatment for various subgroups have changed over time and differ between countries (see Table -  A Comparison of International Guidelines on Goal BP and Initial Drug Therapy for Adults With Hypertension).

References

Blood pressure
Medical comparisons